Santiago Apóstol Parish is the Catholic church and parish house of the people of Atotonilco de Tula. Has always belonged to the Diocese of Tula in Mexico.

References 

1609 establishments in North America
Spanish Colonial architecture in Mexico
Roman Catholic churches in Mexico
Augustinian churches in Mexico
Spanish Catholic Evangelisation in Teotlalpan